Razieh Gholami-Shabani (21 April 1925 – 28 January 2013, Tabriz, Iran) was an Azerbaijani politician and activist.
She was the first female political prisoner in Iranian history and was repeatedly arrested and imprisoned for years, by the Pahlavi dynasty for being a member of Azerbaijan People's Government. Her first arrest, in 1946, was at the age of 21.
She moved to Germany and described her life in a book entitled "Memoirs of a woman". The book was released by publisher Aida in Germany, but banned shortly after in Iran.
Shabani died in Germany on 28 January 2013 at the age of 87.

References

People from Tabriz
Iranian women's rights activists
2013 deaths
1925 births
Azerbaijani Democratic Party politicians
Iranian feminists
20th-century Iranian women politicians
20th-century Iranian politicians
Iranian emigrants to Germany
German people of Azerbaijani descent
Iranian dissidents
Tudeh Party of Iran politicians
German people of Iranian Azerbaijani descent